Diogenes of Athens may refer to:

 Diogenes of Athens (sculptor), sculptor who worked at Rome during the reign of Augustus
 Diogenes of Athens (tragedian), writer of Greek tragedy in the late 5th or early 4th century BC